Ellen Tyne Daly (born February 21, 1946) is an American actress. She has won six Emmy Awards for her television work, a Tony Award and is a 2011 American Theatre Hall of Fame inductee.

Daly began her career on stage in summer stock in New York, and made her Broadway debut in the play That Summer – That Fall in 1967. She is best known for her television role as Detective Mary Beth Lacey in Cagney & Lacey (1982–88), for which she is a four-time Emmy Award winner as Outstanding Lead Actress in a Drama Series. In 1989, she starred in the Broadway revival of Gypsy and won the 1990 Tony Award for Best Actress in a Musical.

Her other TV roles include Alice Henderson in Christy (1994–95), for which she won an Emmy in 1996 and Maxine Gray in Judging Amy (1999–2005), which won her a sixth Emmy in 2003. Her other Broadway credits include The Seagull (1992), her Tony-nominated role in Rabbit Hole (2006) and her Tony-nominated role in Mothers and Sons (2014). She played Maria Callas, both on Broadway and in London's West End, in the play Master Class (2011–12). She portrayed Anne Marie Hoag in Marvel Studios' Spider-Man: Homecoming (2017).

Early years

Daly was born in Madison, Wisconsin, to actor James Daly and actress Mary Hope (née Newell). She is of Irish descent, her ancestors being from Limerick and Kerry. Her younger brother is actor Tim Daly, and she has two sisters, Mary Glynn and Pegeen Michael.

She was raised in Rockland County, New York, where she started her career by performing in summer stock with her family; she earned her Equity Card at age 15. She studied at Brandeis University and the American Musical and Dramatic Academy.

Career

Television
Daly appeared in the CBS police-procedural crime drama Cagney & Lacey as Mary Beth Lacey, the married working mother.  She won the Emmy Award for Outstanding Lead Actress in a Drama Series four times, in 1983, 1984, 1985, 1988, and was a nominee in 1986 and 1987. Between co-star Sharon Gless and herself, they won the Primetime Emmy Award for Outstanding Lead Actress in a Drama Series six years in a row.

In 1991, Daly guest-starred on her brother Tim's series Wings, playing a woman who dates Brian Hackett (Steven Weber), brother of Tim's character Joe. She appeared as social worker Maxine Gray, who was also the mother to the show's title character on the CBS drama Judging Amy, which ran from 1999 to 2005. Addressing a conference of the National Association of Social Workers in 2000, Daly said she had learned from social workers and social work texts to improve her portrayal of her character, and she added: "I take from you because you are the ones dealing with all the bad institutions of our society: institutionalized poverty, institutionalized racism, institutionalized cynicism."

Daly appeared in a made-for-TV movie for Lifetime in 2003 titled Undercover Christmas, as Anne Cunningham. She played the role of a traditional mother and peacemaker at Christmas time in a wealthy family of lawyers, who initially disapproves of her FBI agent son's girlfriend. Among her later television roles, Daly reunited with Cagney & Lacey costar Sharon Gless in a 2010 guest role on the series Burn Notice.

In the fall of 2018, Daly joined the cast of the revival of the Murphy Brown series, playing the character of Phyllis, who runs the bar which Murphy and her coworkers often patronize.

She acted in the last episode of Madam Secretary (2019) and brother Tim Daly was also featured.

Theater
Daly's first Broadway role was in 1967 in a short-lived play, That Summer, That Fall.

In 1988, Daly appeared on the Dolly Parton TV variety show Dolly, and sang (at her request) a duet with Parton. Broadway producer Barry Brown saw the show and, impressed by Daly's performance, decided to mount a revival of the musical Gypsy with Daly in the lead role of Rose. Cagney & Lacey had finished airing, and Daly agreed, and successfully tried out for the part. In April 1989, the Daly-helmed Gypsy revival began a 14-city U.S. tour; it was then presented on Broadway in November 1989.

This production was the second revival of the show to play Broadway (the first was in 1974 with Angela Lansbury). She won the 1990 Tony Award for Best Actress in a Musical for her performance in Gypsy. Daly left Gypsy in July 1990, with Linda Lavin playing Rose, and returned in April 1991 through closing in July 1991.

She appeared in the Broadway revival of the Anton Chekhov play The Seagull in 1992 as Madame Arkadina. She appeared as Sally Adams in the City Center Encores! staged concert of Call Me Madam in February 1995. In regional theatre, she played Lola in Come Back, Little Sheba at the Los Angeles Theatre Center, Los Angeles, in April 1997.

She appeared on Broadway in the 2006 play Rabbit Hole, portraying the mother of the play's protagonist, played by Cynthia Nixon.

In January 2008, she played the role of Mother in the world premiere production of Edward Albee's Me, Myself & I at the McCarter Theatre, Princeton, New Jersey. In 2009, she appeared in the original cast of Love, Loss, and What I Wore.

She debuted the role of Judy Steinberg in It Shoulda Been You, at the George Street Playhouse, New Brunswick, New Jersey, which ran from October 4 to November 6, 2011. The musical ran on Broadway in 2015.

She starred as Maria Callas in Master Class at the Manhattan Theater Club on Broadway, from June 14, 2011 (previews) to September 4, 2011. Daly reprised her role as Maria Callas in the West End production of Master Class, which opened at the Vaudeville Theatre on February 7, 2012 (after previews from January 21) in a limited engagement to April 28, 2012.

Cabaret
Daly performed a cabaret act, Second Time Around, in January 2010 at Feinstein's at Loews Regency, New York City. She had previously performed at Feinstein's in May 2009.

Film
Daly appeared in John and Mary (1969), the biker movie Angel Unchained (1970), the movie adaptation of Play It as It Lays (1972), and The Adulteress. She was cast as Inspector Harry Callahan's first female partner, Kate Moore, in the 1976 Dirty Harry film The Enforcer. The film was critically panned, though a box office success. Daly's performance divided critics, with some calling it too "mannered" for film, while others praised the strength she brought to the role. The concept of a male/female police partnership was later used as the basis for the television show Hunter.

Role model
Daly has been identified as a feminist icon in the media, particularly based on her television role in Cagney and Lacey. Her role as Lacey showed a woman detective at a time where the idea was still novel; the show was also novel in presenting Lacey primarily in a work environment, rather than always showing the character at home. She has also been outspoken about maintaining a natural appearance as she ages, and for the run of Judging Amy, Daly's hair was its naturally gray state and not dyed.

Personal life
Tyne Daly was married to Georg Stanford Brown from 1966 to 1990. They have three daughters, including actress Kathryne Dora Brown.

Discography
 Bernstein: On the Town, conducted by Michael Tilson Thomas, Deutsche Grammophon, 1993

Filmography
Sources:

Film

Television

Theatre work

Broadway

Off-Broadway

Other stage credits

Awards and recognition
Daly has been nominated for the Emmy Award a total of 16 times; she has won 6 times, for the following television performances:
 Lead Actress in a Drama Series for Cagney and Lacey in 1983, 1984, 1985, and 1988
 Supporting Actress in a Drama Series for Christy in 1996
 Supporting Actress in a Drama Series for Judging Amy in 2003

She was also recognized for the following:
 1990: Won the Tony Award for Best Actress in a Musical and the Drama Desk Award for Outstanding Actress in a Musical for her portrayal of Rose in Gypsy
 2006: Nominated for a Tony Award for Best Featured Actress in a Play for her role in Rabbit Hole
 1995: Received a star on the Hollywood Walk of Fame
 2002: Awarded the Women in Film Lucy Award in recognition of her excellence and innovation in her creative works that have enhanced the perception of women through the medium of television
 2011: Inducted into the American Theatre Hall of Fame
 2017: Awarded the Gingold Theatrical Group Golden Shamrock Award

References

External links

Cagney & Lacey official website

1946 births
20th-century American actresses
21st-century American actresses
Actresses from New York (state)
Actresses from Wisconsin
American feminists
American film actresses
American Musical and Dramatic Academy alumni
American stage actresses
American television actresses
Brandeis University alumni
Drama Desk Award winners
Feminist artists
Living people
Outstanding Performance by a Lead Actress in a Drama Series Primetime Emmy Award winners
Outstanding Performance by a Supporting Actress in a Drama Series Primetime Emmy Award winners
Actors from Madison, Wisconsin
People from Westchester County, New York
Tony Award winners